St. Susanna Church is a Roman Catholic parish of the Archdiocese of Boston located in Dedham, Massachusetts. The pastor is Father Stephen S. Josoma, and Laurence J. Bloom is the deacon.  It is known as "one of the most liberal parishes in the Archdiocese of Boston."

The parish was founded in 1960 due to overcrowding at St. Mary of the Assumption Church in Dedham. By the 1930s St. Mary's was one of the biggest parishes in the Archdiocese with over 6,000 parishioners and 1,300 students in Sunday School.  During the middle of that decade there were four priests and six nuns ministering to the congregation.  

In the 1950s it became clear that a second parish was needed in Dedham, and so St. Susanna's was established in February 1960 to serve the needs of the Riverdale neighborhood.  When St. Susanna's opened it had 300 families, while 2,500 stayed at St. Mary's. 

During construction, masses were held at Moseley's on the Charles. The first pastor of St. Susana's, Father Michael Durant, lived at St. Mary's while his church was being constructed. The first mass was said in the new church on February 11, 1962. The church was named by Cardinal Richard Cushing after his titular church, Santa Susanna, in Rome.

In 2000, average attendance at Sunday mass was 1,671, making it the 63rd most active parish out of the 357 parishes then in the archdiocese. It performed the 314th most sacraments in 2001–2002.

The parish garnered the attention of national media during Advent 2018 when the Nativity scene outside of the church showed the Baby Jesus in a cage and the three wise men separated from the others by a fence labeled "deportation."  The scene was a statement on the Trump administration family separation policy and on the condition of refugees more generally.

Notes

References

Works cited

External links

Roman Catholic churches in Massachusetts
Roman Catholic parishes of Archdiocese of Boston
Churches in Dedham, Massachusetts
Christian organizations established in 1960
Roman Catholic churches completed in 1960
20th-century Roman Catholic church buildings in the United States